Richard Kipp Behenna (March 6, 1960 – January 31, 2012) was a Major League Baseball pitcher for the Atlanta Braves in 1983 and the Cleveland Indians from 1983 to 1985. He was part of what was perhaps one of the worst trades ever made by the Braves.  In that deal, the Braves dealt Behenna, third baseman Brook Jacoby, and center fielder Brett Butler to the Indians for their former ace, Len Barker. Barker had a dead arm and was never productive for the Braves.

After the end of his MLB career, Behenna remained active in the game. He served as the pitching coach for the East Coweta High School baseball team. He was also the owner of the Newnan Braves, a baseball team that plays in the Great South League. He died of cancer on January 31, 2012.

References

External links

1960 births
2012 deaths
Atlanta Braves players
Deaths from cancer in Georgia (U.S. state)
Cleveland Indians players
Durham Bulls players
Greenwood Braves players
Kingsport Braves players
Maine Guides players
People from Coweta County, Georgia
Sportspeople from the Atlanta metropolitan area
Richmond Braves players
Savannah Braves players
Baseball players from Miami
Miami Southridge Senior High School alumni